Trinidad and Tobago participated in the 2011 Parapan American Games.

Competitors
The following table lists Bermuda's delegation per sport and gender.

Medalists

Swimming

Women

References

Nations at the 2011 Parapan American Games
2011 in Trinidad and Tobago sport
Trinidad and Tobago at the Pan American Games